The Global Internet Forum to Counter Terrorism (GIFCT) is an Internet industry initiative to share proprietary information and technology for automated content moderation.

History 

Founded in 2017 by a consortium of companies spearheaded by Facebook (now known as Meta), Google/YouTube, Microsoft and Twitter, it was created as an organization in 2019 and its membership has expanded to include 18 companies as of the end of 2021. The GIFCT began as a shared hash database of ISIS-related material but expanded to included a wider array of violent extremist content in the wake of the attack on two mosques in Christchurch, New Zealand that was live streamed on Facebook.

Members include Microsoft, Meta Platforms (Facebook, Instagram and WhatsApp), YouTube, Twitter, Airbnb, Discord, Dropbox, LinkedIn, Amazon, Mailchimp, Pinterest, JustPaste.it, Tumblr, WordPress.com and Zoom.

GIFCT maintains a database of perceptual hashes of terrorism-related videos and images that is submitted by its members, and which other members can voluntarily use to block the same material on their platforms. The material indexed includes images, videos and will be expanded to include URLs and textual data such as manifestos and other documents.

Global Network on Extremism and Technology 

The Global Network on Extremism and Technolgy (GNET) is described as the "academic research arm of GICFT". It is a collaboration of several academic research centers, led by the International Centre for the Study of Radicalisation and Political Violence at King's College London.

Criticism 

GIFCT has been flagged by civil society activists and scholars as a "content cartel" similar to YouTube's ContentID, and a potential tool for "cross-platform censorship".

Accusations of misuse 

In 2022, Facebook, Inc., a subsidiary of Meta Platforms, was subject to a subpoena about GIFCT usage as OnlyFans was alleged to have used GIFCT to harm competitors by getting their content and accounts censored on Instagram. Facebook and OnlyFans have described these allegations as being "without merit".

See also 
 Tech Against Terrorism
 Internet Watch Foundation
 PhotoDNA
 Content filtering

References

External links 
 

Internet-related organizations
Internet censorship
Content moderation
Counterterrorism